This is a list of devices that run on the Symbian platform mobile operating system (Symbian^1, Symbian^2, and Symbian^3), including their proprietary predecessors running on Symbian OS and EPOC.

See also
Series 40 Nokia feature phone OS
Series 90 (software platform) user interface on top of Symbian
Series 80 (software platform) user interface on top of Symbian
List of Android devices competing platform
List of Windows Mobile devices competing platform
List of iOS devices competing platform
UIQ user interface on top of Symbian

References

 https://web.archive.org/web/20121110024134/http://www.developer.nokia.com/Community/Wiki/S60_Platform_and_device_identification_codes

External links
SymbianPoint Devices on the website of the SymbianPoint
Devices on the website of the Symbian Foundation

Computing comparisons
Symbian devices
 
Lists of mobile computers